Christopher Francis Villiers (born 7 September 1960) is an English actor, screenwriter and producer.

Biography

Villiers was born in London, the son of Royal Air Force Volunteer Reserve Wing commander David Hugh Villiers (1921–1962) and his second wife, Elizabeth Barbara, daughter of Leonard Hobbins. His sister, Cat Villiers, is a film producer; brother Jay Villiers is also an actor. A direct descendant of the politician and diplomat Thomas Villiers, 1st Earl of Clarendon, he is a second great-grandson of the Right Reverend Henry Montagu Villiers, Bishop of Durham from 1860–1861, whose brothers were George Villiers, 4th Earl of Clarendon, and Charles Pelham Villiers. Through Henry Montagu Villiers' mother, the brothers descend from Oliver Cromwell. He was educated at Stowe School.

In 1983, he played Tom Bertram in a television serial adaptation of Jane Austen’s Mansfield Park. Villiers may be best known for his former role on Emmerdale, in which he played Grayson Sinclair. He played Captain Nigel Croker in Mile High (2004–2005) and appeared in such films as The Scarlet Pimpernel (1982), Top Secret! (1984), A Hazard of Hearts (1987) and First Knight (1995). In 2003, he co-wrote (with actor/playwright/producer Richard Everett) and co-produced (again, with Everett) British feature film, Two Men Went to War (2002). He also continued to appear in films such as Sliding Doors (1998), Bloody Sunday (2002), Kidulthood (2006) and Land Gold Women (2011).

In 1983, he starred in Sweet Sixteen with Penelope Keith. In 1996, he had a role in Sharpe's Siege. He has also appeared in an episode of Adventure Inc. when filming transferred to the UK for four episodes.

In 1995, Villiers co-founded 2020 Casting, Ltd. The company's credits include Gladiator, Bridget Jones's Diary, Shakespeare in Love, Star Wars, United 93. He appeared in two episodes of Midsomer Murders as David Whitely in both "The Killings at Badger's Drift" in 1997 and "Death's Shadow" in 1999. In 2007, he guest-starred in the Doctor Who audio drama Absolution after having previously appeared in the 1983 TV two-part serial The King's Demons. In 2009, he was seen in the five-part drama series Collision for ITV. In 2013, he appeared in the Father Brown episode "The Blue Cross" as Justin De Vey. He appeared in By Any Means. In 2014, Villiers returned to Doctor Who when he guest starred as Professor Moorhouse in the story "Mummy on the Orient Express".

Emmerdale
On 29 March 2008, ITV released a statement saying Villiers would be written out of Emmerdale as Grayson Sinclair in a summer storyline. Upon the termination of his contract, Villiers stated; "Grayson has been a great character to play but we’ve agreed that the current storyline is going to provide an exciting exit for him. I've got several projects that I'm looking at but you never know, this might not be the last we see of Gray."

Filmography

The Scarlet Pimpernel (1982) - Lord Anthony Dewhurst
Top Secret! (1984) - Nigel "The Torch"
A Hazard of Hearts (1987) - Captain Jackson
First Knight (1995) - Sir Kay
Princess In Love (1996) - James Hewitt, lover of Diana, Princess of Wales
Sliding Doors (1998) - Steve
Bloody Sunday (2002) - Major Steele 
Two Men Went to War (2002) - Dr. Oliver Holmes
Kidulthood (2006) - Mr. Fineal
From Time to Time (2009) - Officer
The Shouting Men (2010) - Christopher
Triassic Attack (2010) - Professor Richmond Keller
Land Gold Women (2011) - Timothy James
The Knot (2012) - Mr. Giddings
Seven Lucky Gods (2014) - Adrian
Chasing Robert Barker (2015) - Robert Barker
 Silent Hours (2015) - George Barton QC
The Coroner (2015) -Tim Morris (Series 1 Episode 7)
The Saint (2017) - Arthur Templar
The ABC Murders (2018 TV miniseries) - Sir Carmichael Clarke
Fisherman’s Friends (2019 film) - Charles Montague

References

External links

1960 births
English male film actors
English male television actors
English screenwriters
English male screenwriters
Living people
Male actors from London
Writers from London
Christopher
People educated at Stowe School